Bogor Paledang Station (BOP) is a railway station located in the city of Bogor, West Java. The station is located in the altitude of +246 meter above sea level. It opened in 2013 to cut down human traffic in Bogor station which now serves commuter trains, KRL Commuterline. In October 2014, the station was expanded because the existing waiting room was insufficient for the passengers and the parking area was too small. As part of double tracking project and preparatory works for electrification towards Sukabumi, the station was upgraded from a simple halt into a full fledged station separate from Bogor station's signalling system. A siding track and a downstream track were added on the eastern part of the railyard. The project forced Pangrango services to temporarily stop operations. Pangrango trains only resumed operation until 10 April 2022, much later than other trains affected by COVID-19 pandemic.

Services
The following is a list of train services at the Bogor Paledang Station.

Passenger services
 Mixed class
 Pangrango, towards  (executive-economy)

References

External links

Bogor
Railway stations in West Java
Railway stations opened in 2013
2013 establishments in Indonesia